Liu Wanchuan (also known as Liu Yi Hai) (November 1, 1906 – November 6, 1991) was a master of the Chinese Neijia (internal) martial art Baguazhang. He studied extensively with the great Baguazhang master Ma Gui (1851-1941), and is considered to be one of only two modern masters (the other being Wang Peisheng) to have successfully passed on Ma Gui's unique lineage to current generations.  According to Liu Wanchuan, the Baguazhang style that Ma Gui taught him using "low basin, small steps, and particularly heavy power and strength," and for those who practice it regularly "at the very least it will add ten or twenty years to your life."

For Baguazhang practitioners, "the most striking characteristic of Ma Gui Baguazhang is the slow and stable circle-walking that develops lower leg strength, qi, blood flow, and whole body power. The body develops to resemble Dong Haichuan and Ma Gui – a thick trunk and back with well developed dantian, firm wrists and ankles, powerful legs and arms, a rosy complexion, and calm expression."

The Ma Gui Baguazhang lineage passed down through Liu Wanchuan is now actively taught around the world in China, Japan, Australia, Norway, the United Kingdom, Canada, and the United States by current Ma Gui Baguazhang lineage holder Li Baohua.

Biography
Born in Haiyang, Shandong Province, Liu Wanchuan started training Baguazhang at age nine with his father Liu Qinglu, his uncle Liu Qingfu (1862-1952), and Liu Qinfu's son Liu Xuehai.  Both his father and uncle were apprentices under Yin Fu in Beijing in the late 1800s.

Move to Beijing
Around 1923, Liu Wanchuan moved to Beijing to make a living and took up advanced studies with Yin Fu's son Yin Yuzhang. He studied with him for eight years.  From the early 1930s onward Liu worked as an accountant for a restaurant called YuChun Lou (Jade Spring Restaurant) that was owned by Li Shao'an (1888-1980) (also known as Li MengRui).  Li Shao'an was from the same village as Liu, and had studied with Li Wenbiao, Yin Yuzhang, Liu Bin, and Liang Zhenpu, to whom he became a formal disciple. Li Shao'an was known for his extraordinary skill in daishou (dragging palm) and was thus given the nickname, "Iron Arm Li."

Training with Ma Gui and Li Shao'an
When Ma Gui fell upon tough times in his later years, Li Shao'an befriended him and helped support him, assisted by Liu Wanchuan.  In appreciation for their kindness, Ma Gui taught Li Shao'an and Liu Wanchuan everything he knew. Together they trained with Ma Gui in the White Cloth Nunnery, an abandoned temple at the time, and learned the full extent of Ma Gui's Baguazhang teachings including: crab palm continuous zhuangzhang (ramming palms), meridian point manipulation, tendon grabbing, meridian blocking, wrist striking, daishou, qiezhang (cutting palm), fire wheel palm, and fanbeichui (backfist) striking skills.

Continuing Ma Gui's Teachings
Liu Wanchuan and Li Shao'an studied together with Ma Gui until his death in 1941, and diligently continued their training throughout their lives. During the Cultural Revolution Li Shao'an was sent back to his hometown in Shandong Province where he lived in poverty for most of his life.  While he trained and taught Baguazhang to select students, to this date no lineage holder of his teachings has been found.
On the other hand, Liu Wanchuan, while experiencing difficult hardships of his own, was able to pass on his teachings to many students after the suppression of the Cultural Revolution had ended. From 1981 on, he taught Ma Gui's Baguazhang openly in Taoran Pavilion Park in Beijing, teaching over fifty people in a class. It is thanks to Liu Wanchuan's teachings after the Cultural Revolution that the lineage of Ma Gui Baguazhang continues to be openly taught throughout the world today.

Liu Wanchuan's Students
Among the many students that Liu Wanchuan directly taught throughout his teaching career, three have been instrumental in keeping the lineage of Ma Gui Baguazhang alive and continuing to this day: Yu Zhiming (1920- ), Fan Yaohua (1934- ), and Li Tao (1943- ). All three have passed on their teachings to fourth generation lineage holder Li Baohua.

References

1906 births
1991 deaths
Chinese baguazhang practitioners